The Afghan men's football champions are the winners of the highest league in Afghan football, which since 2012 is the Afghan Premier League.

List

Kabul City League (1946–2010)

Afghan Premier League (2012–present)

Total titles won
There are 12 clubs who have won the Afghan title.

Teams in bold compete in the Afghan Premier League of the 2019 season

See also
 List of association football competitions

References
General
 

Afghanistan
Afghan Premier League